This is a list of cricketers who have played first-class, List A or Twenty20 cricket for Goa.

A
 Felix Alemao (20/7/1995 – )
 Guru Amonkar ( – )
 Sumiran Amonkar (28/7/1991 – )
 Pravin Amre (14/8/1968 – )
 J. Arunkumar (18/1/1975 – )
 Rohit Asnodkar (5/12/1986 – )
 Swapnil Asnodkar (29/3/1984 – )
 Hemant Angle (13/08/1958 – )

B
 Saurabh Bandekar (16/11/1987 – )
 Yeshwant Barde (15/2/1973 – )
 Rohan Belekar (27/10/1987 – )
 Roger Binny (19/7/1955 – )
 Manvinder Bisla (27/12/1984 – )

C
 V. B. Chandrasekhar (21/8/1961 – )

D
 Amogh Sunil Desai (26/8/1992 – )
 Ashok Dinda (24/03/1984 – )
 Suraj Dongre (27/12/1989 – )
 Robin D'Souza (2/5/1980 – )
 Samar Dubhashi (22/9/1995 – )

F
 Srinivas Fadte (10/10/1993 – )

G
 Harshad Hanumant Gadekar (5/12/1986 – )
 Deepraj Gaonkar (4/4/1998 – )
 Gauresh Gawas (8/12/1990 – )
 Prathamesh Gawas (10/5/1994 – )
 Rajesh Ghodge (1997-2005)
 D. J. Gokulakrishnan (4/1/1973 – )

H
 Nikhil Haldipur (19/12/1977 – )

J
 Vivek Jaisimha (18/3/1964 – )
 Shadab Jakati (27/11/1980 – )
 Manoj Joglekar (1/11/1973 – )

K
 Rana Kalangutkar (19/10/1982 – )
 Sagun Kamat (11/5/1983 – )
 Snehal Kauthankar (19/10/1995 – )
 Rahul Keni ( – )
 Saiyed Khalid (21/10/1975 – )sudin Kamat

M
 Buddhadev Mangaldas (20/6/1988 – )
 Darshan Misal (11/9/1992 – ) Balkrishna Misquin Paresh Misquin
Mahendra S Pai Kuchelkar

N
 Mahind Naik (---)
 Raj Naik (20/12/1974 – )
 Ganeshraj Narvekar (2/2/1993 – )
 Ryan Ninan (19/11/1985 – )

P
 Shikha Pandey (12/5/1989 – )
 Amulaya Pandrekar (31/3/1996 – )
 Heramb Parab (4/9/1998 – )
 Kiran Powar (6/4/1976 – )
 Nilesh Prabhudesai (13/5/1967 – )
 Suyash Prabhudessai (6/12/1997 – ) Sharad Pednekar Raju Pednekar

R
 DC Rajesh (28/3/1975 – )
 Ajay Ratra (13/12/1981 – )
 Abhishek Raut (3/3/1987 – )

S
 Sathiamoorty Saravanan (22/9/1978 – )
 Faisal Shaikh (2/12/1977 – )
 Somashekar Shiraguppi (14/6/1974 – )
 Malik Shirur (21/1/1993 – )
 Ravikant Shukla (9/7/1987 – )
 Vidyut Sivaramakrishnan (3/12/1981 – )
 Sridharan Sriram (21/2/1976 – )

V
 Keenan Vaz (12/9/1991 – )
 Ganapathi Vignesh (11/8/1981 – )

Y
 Amit Yadav (10/10/1989 – )
 Sher Yadav (4/12/1984 – )

See also
 Goans in cricket

References

Goa cricketers

cricketers